Pavel Chihaia (23 April 1922 – 18 June 2019) was a Romanian novelist. 

Born in Corabia, he graduated from the Mircea cel Bătrân High School in Constanța. Between 1941 and 1945 he attended the Faculty of Letters of the University of Bucharest, then worked as an employee at the General Directorate of Theaters until 1948. His first novel, Blocada ("The Blockade"), was published in 1947, shortly before the advent of his country's Communist regime. An opponent thereof, he managed to emigrate in 1978, ultimately settling in Munich, where he died in 2019.

Notes

2019 deaths
1922 births
People from Corabia
Mircea cel Bătrân National College (Constanța) alumni
Romanian novelists
Romanian male novelists
Romanian dissidents
Romanian emigrants to Germany
University of Bucharest alumni